The Continuously Shooting Blunderbuss, also known as "Lianzhu Huochong" (连珠火铳),  was a kind of breech-loading, smooth-bore, single-shot flintlock,  invented by Dai Zi (戴梓), a firearms expert in the early Qing Dynasty, in the thirteenth year of Kangxi (1674).

Usage
The Continuously Shooting Blunderbuss could fire 28 rounds of ammunition at a time and was powerful. These guns played an important role in quelling Geng Jingzhong's Rebellion (耿精忠叛乱).

References

Early firearms
Firearms of China
17th century in China
17th-century weapons
Chinese inventions
Muskets
Military history of the Qing dynasty